Johan Erik "John" Carlsson (5 January 1870 in Stockholm – 24 July 1935 in Värmdö) was a competitive sailor from Sweden, who represented his native country at the 1908 Summer Olympics in Ryde, Isle of Wight, Great Britain in the 8 Metre.

Further reading

References

1870 births
1935 deaths
Sportspeople from Stockholm
Sailors at the 1908 Summer Olympics – 8 Metre
Swedish male sailors (sport)
Olympic sailors of Sweden
20th-century Swedish people